Christine Kreuder Johnson is an American epidemiologist and veterinary scientist who is Professor and Director of the EpiCenter for Disease Dynamics at the One Health Institute. She serves as Professor of Epidemiology and Ecosystem Health at the University of California, Davis. She was elected Fellow of the National Academy of Medicine in 2021.

Early life and education 
Johnson was an undergraduate student at Duke University, where she studied zoology and political science. She moved to the University of Pennsylvania for veterinary studies, where she earned a Veterinary Medicines Directorate in 1994. She moved to the University of California, Davis, where she completed a Master of Preventive Veterinary Medicine. She earned a doctorate on effective methods to assess patterns of mortality in southern sea otters.

Research and career 
Johnson is the Director of the EpiCenter for Disease Dynamics at the One Health Institute. Her research looks to understand the impacts of environmental change on animal health. The findings of her research are used to inform public policy and better prepare for emerging threats. In particular, she is focused on identifying fault lines for disease emergence, spillover and spread. She had looked to understand the impact of the climate crisis on disease and the land-to-sea movement of pathogens. Johnson has continued to work on sea otters since her doctoral research, showing that long-term exposure to domoic acid can cause fatal heart disease. Domoic acid is produced in algal blooms that occur in unusually warm waters and then accumulate in crabs and clams.

Johnson's research has evaluated the way humans impact wildlife through habitat loss, hunting and trade-related activity. She believed that there was spillover risk that viruses from animal species would be transmitted into humans. Johnson showed that domesticated animals share the highest number of viruses with humans, and that species threatened by hunting and decreases in habitat quality host twice as many zoonotic viruses as those endangered for other reasons.

Johnson was part of the United States Agency for International Development (USAID) PREDICT research programme. The programme was shut down by the Trump administration in March 2020. Johnson called for veterinary and agricultural researchers to be engaged in the fight against COVID-19. In August 2020, with support from the National Institute of Allergy and Infectious Diseases, Johnson established the EpiCenter for Emerging Infectious Disease Intelligence (EEIDI). The centre is focused on disease emergence in the Congo and Amazon Basin forest regions.

Awards and honors 
 2008 Appointed to Council of the Wildlife Disease Association
 2012 University of California, Davis Distinguished Faculty Teaching Award
 2021 Elected Fellow of the National Academy of Medicine

Selected publications

References 

Women veterinary scientists
University of California, Davis faculty
University of California, Davis alumni
University of Pennsylvania School of Veterinary Medicine alumni
Members of the National Academy of Medicine
Living people
Year of birth missing (living people)